United Nations Security Council resolution 1538, adopted unanimously on 21 April 2004, after expressing concern about the administration and management of the Oil-for-Food Programme in Iraq, the council ordered an inquiry to investigate the matter.

The security council expressed its willingness to see an investigation into the allegations that the Iraqi government had evaded the provisions of Resolution 661 (1990) through bribery, kickbacks, surcharges on sales of oil and illicit payments in regard to purchases of humanitarian goods. Additionally, there were media reports that corruption and fraud had occurred during the management and administration of the Programme, established in Resolution 986 (1995). The allegations first appeared in January 2004 in the Iraqi newspaper Al Mada which alleged that 270 former government officials, activists and journalists from 46 countries had profited from the Programme. The council reaffirmed that illegal activities carried out by any representatives of the United Nations were unacceptable.

The resolution welcomed the establishment of an independent high-level inquiry into the matter by the Secretary-General Kofi Annan and stressed the need for full co-operation with the inquiry by the Coalition Provisional Authority, United Nations officials and personnel, Iraq and all Member States.

See also
 Gulf War
 Invasion of Kuwait
 Iraq sanctions
 Iraq War
 List of United Nations Security Council Resolutions 1501 to 1600 (2003–2005)
 Oil-for-Food Program Hearings

References

External links
 
Text of the Resolution at undocs.org

 1538
2004 in Iraq
 1538
United Nations Oil-for-Food scandal
April 2004 events